The Taiwan tube-nosed bat (Murina puta) is a species of vesper bat in the family Vespertilionidae.
It is found only in Taiwan. It is a close relative of Hutton's tube-nosed bat, and might even be the same species.

References

Murininae
Mammals of Taiwan
Endemic fauna of Taiwan
Taxonomy articles created by Polbot
Mammals described in 1924
Bats of Asia